The Museum of Contemporary Art is a contemporary art museum in Isfahan, Iran, located next to the Museum of Natural History. The museum is housed in the Chaharbagh Palace, originally built in 17th century under Safavid rule.

Building
Dates from the 17th century, the building was a small royal museum during the Safavid period, located near Chehel Sotoun palace and the center of Isfahan. It was known as Jobbeh Khaneh (house of weapons) in the Safavid period, as the museum housed a collection of military artifacts. Rebuilt during Qajar rule, the building has been decorated by stuccoed forms, which are the principal architectural feature of the Qajar period. There are many patterns of flowers and vase, which are a distinctive feature of decoration in the Qajar period. This feature is one that distinguishes the Qajar age from the Safavid age, in which flowers were never in vases.

During Qajar rule, the building was transformed into the residence of the governor of Isfahan under Massoud Mirza Zulfal Sultan. After the transfer of the Isfahan governor's residence into the newly erected building, the mansion was restored and turned again into a Museum.

Museum
The museum is open from 9 a.m. to 12 p.m. and from 5 to 8 p.m. in the spring and summer. In the autumn and winter, it is open from 9 a.m. to 12 p.m. and 4 to 7 p.m.

References

Museums with year of establishment missing
Museums in Isfahan
Art museums and galleries in Iran
Contemporary art galleries in Iran
Architecture in Iran